Alatskivi is a small borough in Peipsiääre Parish Tartu County Estonia. It was the administrative centre of Alatskivi Parish. Alatskivi has around 390 population by 2015 with 128 square kilometers land.

The main sight in Alatskivi is the gothic style castle of a local manor.

People
Juhan Liiv (1864–1913), the poet, was born in Alatskivi.

Gallery

Boroughs and small boroughs in Estonia
Kreis Dorpat